Banzai Runner is a 1987 American action film starring Dean Stockwell, John Shepherd, Charles Dierkop, Rick Fitts, Dawn Schneider, Billy Drago and directed by John G. Thomas.

Plot
A group of wealthy motorists drive exotic cars at extreme speeds late at night on the public highways. These drivers are referred to as the Banzai Runners. The majority of the Runners participate for the excitement of the driving, but one of the Runners is a cruel, ruthless drug dealer. During one of these contests, a policeman is killed. With no witnesses, it's up to the cop's brother to see justice is done. He accomplishes this by assuming a false identity and joining the race. To join the group of Runners, the police officer goes undercover, and obtains a 1972 DeTomaso Pantera.  With this car he competes in an all out fight to the finish with the evil drug dealer.

Cast
Dean Stockwell as Barry Baxter
John Shepherd as Beck Baxter
Charles Dierkop as Traven
Barry Sattels as Osborne
Billy Drago as Syszek
Dawn Schneider as Shelley
Ann Cooper as Maysie
Rick Fitts as Winaton
John Wheeler as Hawkins
Biff Yeager as Graham

References

External links

1987 films
1987 action films
American action films
American auto racing films
American chase films
Films scored by Joel Goldsmith
1980s English-language films
1980s American films